The German Historical Institutes (GHI), (DHI) are six independent academic research institutes of the Max Weber Foundation dedicated to the study of historical relations between Germany and the host countries in which they are based.

The institutes are:
German Historical Institute in Rome (established in 1888)
German Historical Institute Paris (1958)
German Historical Institute London (1976)
German Historical Institute Washington DC (1987)
German Historical Institute Warsaw (1993)
German Historical Institute Moscow (2005)

See also 
 German Studies Association
 Perspectivia.net

References

 
History institutes
Historiography of Germany
Max Weber Foundation